Jeux sans frontières was a Europe-wide television game show. The 1997 edition was won by the team from Amadora in Portugal.

Participating countries and cities

Heat 1

Broadcast Date (Europe): Monday 30 June 1997;
Venue: Óbuda Esplanade, Budapest, Hungary

Heat 2

Broadcast Date (Europe): Monday 7 July 1997;
Venue: Óbuda Esplanade, Budapest, Hungary

Heat 3

Broadcast Date (Europe): Monday 14 July 1997;
Venue: Óbuda Esplanade, Budapest, Hungary

Heat 4

Broadcast Date (Europe): Monday 21 July 1997;
Venue: Óbuda Esplanade, Budapest, Hungary

Heat 5

Broadcast Date (Europe): Monday 28 July 1997;
Venue: Óbuda Esplanade, Budapest, Hungary

Heat 6

Broadcast Date (Europe): Monday 4 August 1997;
Venue: Óbuda Esplanade, Budapest, Hungary

Heat 7

Broadcast Date (Europe): Monday 11 August 1997;
Venue: Óbuda Esplanade, Budapest, Hungary

Heat 8

Broadcast Date (Europe): Monday 18 August 1997;
Venue: Óbuda Esplanade, Budapest, Hungary

Heat 9

Broadcast Date (Europe): Monday 25 August 1997;
Venue: Óbuda Esplanade, Budapest, Hungary

Final

Broadcast Date (Europe): Monday 1 September 1997;
Venue: Lisbon, Portugal;
The teams which qualified from each country to the final were:

Final table

Jeux sans frontières
1997 television seasons
Television game shows with incorrect disambiguation